"A Princess, an Elf, and a Demon Walk Into a Bar" is the series premiere episode of Netflix's original streaming television series Disenchantment. The episode was directed by Dwayne Carey-Hill and written by Matt Groening and Josh Weinstein. It was released on Netflix on August 17, 2018, along with the rest of the series.

The production code is 1DNT01, and the episode stars Abbi Jacobson, Eric Andre, and Nat Faxon as the title characters, Princess Bean, puny elf Elfo, and demon Luci.

Plot 
On the morning of Princess Bean's wedding day, she escapes to a bar to play cards with the other attendants. She takes the money, then escapes the bar as the others try to rob her. Upon exiting the building, she is stopped by Odval, the advisor of King Zøg, Bean's father. Odval takes her back to the castle for handmaiden Bunty to get her ready for her "big day." The procession from Bentwood, a neighboring kingdom, arrives, and introduces Guysbert, the eldest child of King Lorenzo I and Queen Bunny, whom Bean is set to wed. Zøg and Queen Oona of Dreamland, Bean's hometown and the setting of the show, are there to greet Guysbert's parents. Meanwhile, in Elfwood, the land of the elves, Elfo is not happy with his boring job at a pre-packaged candy assortment assembly line, and wishes for something more. When King Rulo declares that Elfo cannot date his girlfriend Kissy anymore, he leaves Elfwood, an act that has only ever been done by legendary elf Leavo before. Elfo adventures through the forest and eventually comes to Dreamland.

Back in the castle, Bean finds a strange gift among the pile of wedding presents. In it is Luci, a "personal demon," as he calls himself. Bean tries to get rid of Luci, but finally accepts him when he promises to help her get out of her wedding. Elsewhere, two mysterious figures watch Bean as she meets Luci. While wandering the castle playing pranks on Zøg, Bean runs into Oona, her step-mother who married Zøg for a political alliance much like Bean is about to do with Guysbert. The two talk until the wedding commences. Elfo meets two humble farmers who give him food and drink on his way to the castle. Bean turns Guysbert down, and, subsequently, he ends up impaled on a decorative throne of swords. Lorenzo I and Bunny converse with Zøg and Oona and eventually they decide to have Bean wed Guysbert's younger brother, Merkimer. Elfo arrives just in time to help Bean escape, and the two (along with Luci) enter the Enchanted Forest. Zøg sends Sir Pendergast, Turbish, and Mertz to go and find Bean and Elfo. Meanwhile, Bean, Elfo and Luci are instructed by a fairy to go visit the Wishmaster, a being who lives up on top of a mountain who can grant wishes to those who seek him. When the trio arrive at the top of the mountain, though, they realize that he is actually the Washmaster, who washes people's clothes, and that Merkimer and the Dreamland knights are headed their way.

Production 
The episode, along with all other ten episode in part one, was released on Netflix on August 17, 2018.

Reception 
Ars Technica praised the episode. The A.V. Club wrote that the show "got off to a rocky start" and "plays like an extended first act rather than a discrete episode." Media company Den of Geek thought the episode just wasn't as funny as expected.

References

External links 
 

Disenchantment
2018 American television episodes
American television series premieres
Animated television episodes
Netflix original television series episodes